Grootaertia is a genus of flies in the family Dolichopodidae from the Afrotropical realm. The genus is named after the Belgian entomologist Patrick Grootaert.

Species
Grootaertia anomalipennis Grichanov, 1999
Grootaertia anomalopyga Grichanov, 1999
Grootaertia asymmetrica Grichanov, 1999
Grootaertia bistylata Grichanov, 1999
Grootaertia brevipennis Grichanov, 2000
Grootaertia irwini Grichanov, 2000
Grootaertia kuznetsovi Grichanov, 1999
Grootaertia skorpionensis Grichanov, Kirk-Spriggs & Grootaert, 2006

References

Dolichopodidae genera
Medeterinae
Diptera of Africa